The Indonesia women's national under-18 volleyball team represents Indonesia in women's under-18 volleyball events.

External links
Official website

volleyball
Women's volleyball in Indonesia
National women's under-18 volleyball teams